Guindy railway station is one of the railway stations of the Chennai Beach–Chengalpattu section of the Chennai Suburban Railway Network. It serves the neighbourhood of Guindy, a suburb of Chennai. It is located at about 14 km from Chennai Beach terminus and is situated at NH 45 in Anna Salai, with an elevation of 12 m above sea level.

History
With the completion of track-lying work of the Chennai Beach–Tambaram section of the Chennai Suburban Railway Network in March 1931, which began in 1928, the suburban services were started on 11 May 1931 between Beach and Tambaram, and the tracks were electrified on 15 November 1931, with the first MG EMU services running on 1.5 kV DC. The section was converted to 25 kV AC traction on 15 January 1967.

Gallery

See also

 Chennai Suburban Railway
 Railway stations in Chennai

References

External links
 Guindy railway station on IndiaRailInfo.com
 Local Train timings from/to Guindy

Stations of Chennai Suburban Railway
Railway stations in Chennai
Railway stations opened in 1931